The FIBT World Championships 1957 took place in St. Moritz, Switzerland for the record eighth time. The Swiss city had hosted the event previously in 1931 (Four-man), 1935 (Four-man), 1937 (Four-man), 1938 (Two-man), 1939 (Two-man), 1947, and 1955. It also marked the first time the unified championships took place in the same location in consecutive championships.

Two man bobsleigh

This is Spain's only medal at the FIBT World Championships as of 2016. Portago would die later that year in the Mille Miglia competition in Italy.

Four man bobsleigh

Medal table

References
2-Man bobsleigh World Champions
4-Man bobsleigh World Champions

IBSF World Championships
Sport in St. Moritz
1957 in bobsleigh
International sports competitions hosted by Switzerland
Bobsleigh in Switzerland 
1957 in Swiss sport